John Lewis Brenner (February 2, 1832 – November 1, 1906) was an American farmer, nurseryman, businessman and member of the United States House of Representatives from Ohio.

Early life

John L. Brenner was born in Wayne Township, Montgomery County, Ohio, the son of Jacob S. Brenner and Sarah Ann Matthews.  His parents left Virginia because of a dislike of slavery and settled in Ohio; Jacob was a miller and farmer.  John Brenner worked on his father's farm in the summer and attended the local public schools in the winter.  He finished his education at the Springfield (Ohio) Academy.

John Brenner married Josephine Moore and farmed in Wayne township until 1862.  He then became interested in the nursery business which he pursued very successfully until 1872.  In 1866, he moved to Dayton, Ohio, then emerging as a center of tobacco agriculture in Ohio, where he became a merchant in leaf tobacco.

Career
John L. Brenner was elected a member of the City of Dayton board of police commissioners, serving from 1885 to 1887.  In 1896, Brenner was elected as a Democrat to the Fifty-fifth Congress and re-elected to another term in the Fifty-sixth Congress.  Ohio's third district was at the time evenly divided between the two parties, and Mr. Brenner's plurality at each election was barely 100 votes.  Brenner was an unsuccessful candidate for renomination in 1900.

Later life and death
After his congressional service, John Lewis Brenner returned to Dayton and resumed his former occupation as a dealer in leaf tobacco.  He died in Dayton and was interred in Woodland Cemetery, Dayton, Ohio.

Sources

 Taylor, William A. Ohio in Congress from 1803 to 1901. Columbus, Ohio: The XX Century Publishing Company, 1900.
 History of Dayton, Ohio. Dayton, Ohio: United Brethren Publishing House, 1889, 753 pgs.

1832 births
1906 deaths
Politicians from Dayton, Ohio
Burials at Woodland Cemetery and Arboretum
19th-century American politicians
Businesspeople from Dayton, Ohio
Democratic Party members of the United States House of Representatives from Ohio
19th-century American businesspeople